The M56 "Scorpion" Self-Propelled Gun is an American unarmored, airmobile self-propelled tank destroyer, which was armed with a 90mm M54 gun with a simple blast shield, and an unprotected crew compartment.

History
The M56 was manufactured from 1953 to 1959 by the Cadillac Motor Car Division of General Motors for use by US airborne forces, though the vehicle was eventually used by the Spanish Navy Marines, Morocco and South Korea. With a crew of four (commander, gunner, loader and driver), the M56 weighed  empty and  combat-loaded. It had infrared driving lights but no NBC protection and was not amphibious.

The M56 was a fully tracked vehicle with rubber-tired run-flat road wheels and front drive sprocket wheels. Twenty-nine rounds of main gun ammunition were carried, and only the small 5 mm thick blast shield was armored.

In service

The M56 saw combat service with U.S. forces in the Vietnam War. It was deployed with the 173rd Airborne Brigade, which was the only Airborne Brigade deployed with the M56, where it was used mainly in a direct fire-support role. Its function as an air-mobile, self-propelled, anti-tank vehicle was eventually replaced in Vietnam by the troubled but effective M551 Sheridan which had a fully armored turret. The USMC used the Ontos, which had an armored cabin and was armed with recoilless rifles, in a similar role (the running gear of the first Ontos prototype was the same as on the M56, but it was replaced for the production variant).

As for foreign operators, Morocco was the only export customer which used M56 Scorpions in actual combat. M56 Scorpions were deployed against Polisario rebels during the Western Sahara War. A number of examples were made available to South Korea but not used.

Operators

Former operators

: 5 exported in 1965. Used by Tercio de Armada from 1966 to 1970
: 1 for evaluation in 1960
: 87 received in 1966-1967
: 60 ex-American M56 were left as surplus but never used

Survivors

United States
American Legion Post 8 in Guntersville, Alabama.
Two of them can be found in the American Military Museum in South El Monte, California.
American Legion post in Duluth, Georgia.
Ropkey Armor Museum in Crawfordsville, Indiana
Veterans Memorial Stadium in Cedar Rapids, Iowa.
Iowa Gold Star Museum at Camp Dodge in Johnston, Iowa.
Combat Air Museum at the former Forbes Field, in Topeka, Kansas.
Forest Hill Station in Millersburg, Kentucky.
Boyd County War Memorial in Armco Park in Summit, Kentucky.
One can be found in Constitution Park in Cumberland, Maryland.
Military Vehicle Technology Foundation's facility in Portola Valley, in California. However, it will soon be relocated to the Collings Foundation in Stow, Massachusetts.
Elmwood Park, New Jersey.
82nd Airborne War Memorial Museum in Fort Bragg, North Carolina.
Fort Sill, Oklahoma
45th Infantry Museum in Oklahoma City, Oklahoma.
One can be found in the city of Elkton, South Dakota on the corner of Elk St. and 3rd St.
American Legion Hall, Post 88, in Donelson, Tennessee.
Texas Military Forces Museum, Camp Mabry in Austin, Texas.
Veterans of Foreign Wars Post 2524 Culpeper, Virginia.
A restored M56 is on display at the American Armored Foundation Tank Museum in Danville, Virginia, along with a diorama of a destroyed M56.
A well preserved M56 can be found in a city park in Auburn, Washington.
Tillicum Park in Forks, Washington.
 One example can be found outside the Mississippi Armed Forces Museum at Camp Shelby.

South Korea
One former Republic of Korea Army example on display at the War Memorial of Korea.

See also
G-numbers (SNL G289)
M-numbers
FV4401 Contentious

References

Notes

Bibliography

External links

90 mm Self-propelled Gun M56 Scorpion
American Armored Foundation Tank Museum Website

Cold War armored fighting vehicles of the United States
Tank destroyers of the United States
Airborne fighting vehicles
Military vehicles introduced in the 1950s